Murder in Small Town X (sometimes abbreviated MiSTX) is an American reality television series created by George Verschoor, Robert Fisher Jr., and Gordon Cassidy and was hosted by Sgt. Gary Fredo, a California Police Investigator, that aired on Fox from July through September 2001.

Although classified as a reality television series, given the format's unique nature, it was more accurately described as a hybrid of a reality TV show, game show, and mystery drama. It is notable for the fact that its winner, New York City fireman Ángel Juarbe Jr., died in the September 11 attacks exactly one week after the show's finale aired.

Premise
The premise of the show was to bring 10 contestants from around the United States of America to the small fishing village of Eastport, Maine (called "Sunrise" in the show) to act as amateur investigators to solve a series of fictional murders.

Initially, the investigators were given a list of 15 suspects who were "townspeople" played by actors and actresses. A large number of improvisational actors and actresses were stationed around the real-life town, and their job was to provide clues (useful and not useful) to the investigators. Each week, the investigators were sent out on varying missions around the town in order to discover clues to clear suspects. Additionally, the murderer would strike again, clearing suspects as well.

In every episode a Lead Investigator, or Lifeguard, is chosen. In the first episode, the Lifeguard is chosen by picking one of ten cards. For the following episodes, the Lifeguard is chosen by the investigator who was eliminated the previous episode via pre-recorded message. For the final two investigators, the previous investigator who was eliminated will determine who gets his or her first choice on which suspect they want to pursue.

Every three days, two envelopes, red and black, would be discovered somewhere in the town. In the red envelope, there would be a question about what the investigators had learned during the day. The question would usually be pointed to one of the track teams, meaning whoever was involved with that line of investigation has the highest potential of answering it correctly. The team's answer would be sent to the killer via e-mail, with the address being anonymous. If correct, the killer would clear one of the remaining suspects. If wrong, the number of suspects would remain the same.

Afterward, the black envelope would be opened. It contains two smaller black envelopes, each containing a map of a certain location. The investigators (except the Lifeguard) would go into a separate room to vote for the first person who will play the Killer's game. After the vote, the Lifeguard picks the second person who will play. The two investigators would each choose a map and head out to the two different remote locations completely alone, with their movements recorded only by night-vision cameras. One of the investigators would discover an important clue to the mystery, whereas the other would be eliminated off the show by being "murdered by the killer", with their last seconds seen through the eyes of said "killer" in the manner of classical slasher films.

Story
The game started out with the mysterious murder of a family known as the Flints, on which the investigators would base their investigation. It soon turned out there was much more to this case when suspects started to turn up dead. The solution to the mystery involved the discovery that the members of a local family, the Duchamps, had been murdered together in 1941 just after the Pearl Harbor Attack because they had stumbled onto a town's secret involving illegal liquor smuggling from Canada. The murder had been committed with the assent of many of the town's leaders, who met in a secret lodge, a society called "The Order of the Scarlet Lupine" or the "O.S.L." The family had been bound in a room together, and the room was set on fire.

The "murders" were being committed by a descendant of one of the family members who escaped the fire and who was gaining his revenge against the descendants of the town leaders who had condoned the burning of the family in 1941. This survivor, known as the "Burnt Face Man", left several recordings of himself to his child, which were clues for the investigators. As it turned out, he murdered one of the men responsible for the killing of his family, but he was overwhelmed with guilt and committed suicide. The burnt man's child decided to take up his father's work, attacking those responsible or descendants of those responsible for his family's death. Using a bang stick, a close-range rifle-like weapon used to kill fish, not only was he not overwhelmed with guilt like his father, he found it exciting, and decided to make a game of it, resulting in the creation of the killers game.

The killer was revealed to be William Lambert (whose real last name is Duchamps), a business partner of Nate Flint and a common target of suspicion (although all initial theories about him turned out to be irrelevant). He killed the people that were either related to or are the members of the O.S.L. They were Blodgett (killed by his father), DeBeck, Flint, Merchant, Rose, Thibodeaux, and the eliminated investigators, using their corpses to recreate the unfinished family dinner they had before being interrupted by the fire. Samantha "Sam" Larabee was supposed to be William's last victim (completing the set), but in the finale, Ángel, the winner, rescued her before William was able to complete his final murder. The fictional police chief, Dudley Duncan, chased him up a flight of stairs and shot him in his bedroom, sending him crashing out the window and falling two stories to the hard concrete below.

Contestants

Voting history

 The investigator winner.
 The investigator was chosen as the lifeguard, and could not vote or be voted against.
 The investigator was chosen to play the killer's game, and found the killer clue at their location, surviving and returning to the group.
 The investigator was chosen to play the killer's game, and was ambushed and murdered by the killer at their location, eliminating them.

Italic names represent non-revealed votes, but were based on alliances.

In episode 6, a tie vote occurred between Jeff and Kristen. When asked to break the tie as a lifeguard, Katie opted to send both out to play the Killer's Game.

In the finale, Alan and Jeff didn't vote against each other. Because Ángel was immune (as he was chosen by Katie to be the lifeguard), there was no reason to vote and Alan and Jeff were immediately handed their maps.

The game

The Killer's Questions
During each episode, the investigators would find a pair of red and black envelopes. While the black envelopes were for the Killer's Game, the red envelopes contained a questions for the investigators. The question usually pertained to one specific part of the day's investigation, and was only able to be answered correctly by the investigators that took part in the investigation at that point. For example, in Episode 2 the question was "what was the date of Oscar Blodgett's birth?" Andy and Angel were guarding his grave plot after it was vandalized and would be the ones who could answer it. When the group decided on an answer, they would email the answer to the killer's anonymous email address. The killer would then send them confirmation of a correct or incorrect answer. A correct answer eliminated a suspect, while an incorrect answer did nothing (this however is unknown since all questions were answered correctly.)

The Suspects
These are fifteen suspects, in the order they were cleared of being the killer.

Kristen found G.D. at the end of the Killer's Game. Because Brian was killed by the killer, G.D. could not be the killer. In addition, G.D. was killed that night, but not found out until the next day.

Samantha was going to be William's final victim, but Angel rescued her before he could kill her.

Prudence was cleared because the Burnt Man says, "Goodbye my son...". This indicated that the killer had to be male.

Jimmy was cleared because he was too young to be the Burnt Man's son. He was 21, as the Burnt Man's final film is from 30 years ago.

Episodes

Season 1

Death of Ángel Juarbe Jr.
Exactly one week after the airing of the finale, the show's overall winner, Ángel Juarbe Jr., being a seven-year veteran of the FDNY, was a part of one of the first units to the World Trade Center emergency. He was caught in the collapse of the first tower. (According to Richard Hoeg, Ángel Juarbe Jr. was not caught in the collapse of the first tower. Rather he was caught in the collapse of the adjoining Marriott Hotel while he and a lieutenant from Ladder 12 (the same company as Juarbe) was attempting a rescue of another firefighter.) On November 28, 2001, his body was found and identified in the Marriott hotel rubble next to the World Trade Center towers. He was laid to rest on December 1, 2001. The show's primary icon, the fisherman statue, now serves as memorial to Juarbe.

Cancellation
The series did not achieve strong ratings and was not renewed by Fox. The format was sold to the BBC who made a British version (with slight amendments to the rules) in 2003 entitled The Murder Game. Ratings were poor and the program was not a critical success.

International versions

See also 
 Whodunnit? (2013 TV series)
 Escape the Night
 Busted!

References

External links
 
 Website discussing the British version.

Fox Broadcasting Company original programming
2000s American reality television series
2001 American television series debuts
2001 American television series endings
Eastport, Maine
Television series about fictional serial killers
Television shows filmed in Maine